Phaulotettix is a genus of Nearctic, grasshoppers in the family Acrididae and subfamily Melanoplinae. There are about 15 described species in Phaulotettix.

Species
These 15 species belong to the genus Phaulotettix:

 Phaulotettix ablusus Barrientos Lozano, Rocha-Sánchez & Méndez-Gómez, 2 c g
 Phaulotettix adiaphoros Barrientos Lozano, Rocha-Sánchez & Méndez-Gómez, 2 c g
 Phaulotettix adibilis Barrientos Lozano, Rocha-Sánchez & Méndez-Gómez, 2 c g
 Phaulotettix adynatos Barrientos Lozano, Rocha-Sánchez & Méndez-Gómez, 2 c g
 Phaulotettix affinis Barrientos Lozano, Rocha-Sánchez & Méndez-Gómez, 2 c g
 Phaulotettix altissimus Barrientos Lozano, Rocha-Sánchez & Méndez-Gómez, 2 c g
 Phaulotettix ambrosius Barrientos Lozano, Rocha-Sánchez & Méndez-Gómez, 2 c g
 Phaulotettix arcadius Barrientos Lozano, Rocha-Sánchez & Méndez-Gómez, 2 c g
 Phaulotettix compressus Scudder, S.H., 1897 c g b
 Phaulotettix eurycercus Hebard, 1918 i c g b (sotol grasshopper)
 Phaulotettix flaccidus Barrientos Lozano, Rocha-Sánchez & Méndez-Gómez, 2 c g
 Phaulotettix huastecus Buzzetti, Barrientos Lozano & Fontana, 2010 c g
 Phaulotettix jocundus Barrientos Lozano, Rocha-Sánchez & Méndez-Gómez, 2 c g
 Phaulotettix nimius Barrientos Lozano, Rocha-Sánchez & Méndez-Gómez, 2 c g
 Phaulotettix opimus Barrientos Lozano, Rocha-Sánchez & Méndez-Gómez, 2 c g

Data sources: i = ITIS, c = Catalogue of Life, g = GBIF, b = Bugguide.net

References

Further reading

 
 

Melanoplinae
Articles created by Qbugbot